Auslikon is a village (:de:Aussenwacht) of the municipality of Pfäffikon in the canton of Zurich in Switzerland.

Geography
Auslikon is located in the district of Pfäffikon in the Zürcher Oberland on the eastern shore of the Pfäffikersee (Lake Pfäffikon).

Points of interest
In Auslikon there is a popular lido and a camping site, within the nature reserve on the Pfäffikersee lake shore.

References

External links

 Official website of the municipality of Pfäffikon (ZH) 
 Dorfverein Auslike-Balm 

Villages in the canton of Zürich
Pfäffikon, Zürich
Pfäffikersee